This is a list of Royal Military College of Canada memorials and traditions.

Skylarks

Traditions

Class gifts

RMC Militaria collectibles

 Royal Military College of Canada Officer Cadet action figure, made for 2006 Great Canadian Action Figure Convention in Kingston, Ont. The male model figure can wear a 1st year scarlet dress uniform jacket with academic achievement badges or a 4th year senior cadet's #4s patrol jacket with academic and sports badges, plus belt with a dress navy trousers with red piping. In addition, the figure wears leather ankle boots with Vibrom soles, leather gaiters, leather belt with metal RMC buckle, and a leather bayonet frog. The arms include a metal C7 rifle and metal bayonet with metal scabbard. The box features RMC landmarks and a description of the College in English and French.
 Royal Military College of Canada Officer Cadet 54mm pewter Toy Soldiers include: Cadet Squadron Leader with sword and four first year cadets with FNC1 rifle. The female and male cadets are dressed in Scarlet Ceremonial uniforms with white belts, pillbox hats, dark trousers with red piping, gaiters and black boots.
 Royal Military College of Canada officer cadet 'Gentlemen Cadet' 80 mm metal figure No. 53 c. 1980 by Chas C. Stadden Studios.

Currie Hall

General Sir Arthur Currie officially opened Currie Hall at Royal Military College on 17 May 1922. General Sir Arthur Currie made the following comments, "I cannot tell you how utterly embarrassed and yet how inexpressibly proud I am to witness this ceremony, and to be present when this hall is officially opened. This hall is to commemorate the deeds of our fellow comrades whom it was my great honour and privilege to command during the latter years of the War." The Currie Hall is decorated with the crests and battle colours of every unit that fought in France during World War I.

His Excellency John Ralston Saul (February 2004) described the Currie Hall decorations, "This is an astonishing hall in which to speak.  If you gaze up at the initials on the ceiling and at the paintings and the painted insignia around the walls, you are reminded that Canada is not a new country."... "Militarily speaking, we have been at it for a long time.  This hall is a conceptualisation of our participation in the First World War.  All of that grandeur and tragedy is pulled together here in a remarkable way.  I'm not sure that we could reproduce a hall of this sort to describe our military experiences of the last half century."

Memorial arch

The Memorial Arch, at the Royal Military College of Canada in Kingston, Ontario, built in 1923, is a monument which honours the memory of ex-cadets who have died in combat or while attending the College. The Memorial Arch, designed by John M. Lyle, is an example of the Beaux-Arts architecture. Lyle's design won a competition in which seven Canadian architects were invited to compete. Leigh French singles out the Memorial Arch as "an outstanding example of coherent purpose and well considered form, unlike many of the war memorial projects that emerged immediately after World War I". The Indiana limestone arch on a base of Quebec granite was built at a cost of $75,000.

The arch was unveiled by Mrs. Joshua Wright, mother of two cadets who gave their lives in the First World War. #558 Major G.B. Wright, DSO, RCE, was killed in action in France on 21 May 1915. #814 Major J.S. Wright, 50th Bn CEF, was killed in action in France on 18 Nov 1916.

The memorial includes the following texts:
 Hark now the drums beat up again for all true Soldiers Gentlemen. from Over the Hills and Far Away (traditional)
 Je me souviens French I remember
 Truth Duty Valour
 Blow out your bugles over the rich dead. There's none of these so lonely and poor of old but dying has made us rarer gifts than gold. by Rupert Brooke
 Pro Deo et Patrio, Latin for God and Country

The RMC Memorial Arch provides a list of officer cadets who were killed in action or died from wounds suffered in action under the following headings:
 The Emin Pasha Relief Expedition 1887–90,
 West Africa 1892,
 South Africa 1899–1901,
 Great War 1914-1918 battles: Mons, Marne, Aisne, Ypres, Festubert, Loos, Somme, Vimy, Kut el Amara, Gallipoli, Hill 70, Passchendaele, Cambrai, Amiens, Arras, Drocourt-Quéant, Canal du Nord.
 World War II battles: Battle of the Atlantic, Battle of Britain, Burma, Dieppe, Hong Kong, Lombardy Plain, Normandy.
 Active service 1926-1945: India, 1926, North Africa, North West Germany, The Pacific, Pas de Calais, The Rhine, Sicily, Southern Italy.

Two bronze plaques on the flanking plinths of the Arch, which were unveiled by the Governor General on 15 September 1949, commemorates the fallen from World War II. As required, names of those lost in Korea and on peacekeeping and other military operations have been added.

Historical pieces of artillery

Memorials

Commemorative and memorial stained glass windows

Commemorative and memorial trees

Monuments

Plaques
There are numerous plaques erected by federal, provincial, municipal and private authorities on the grounds of the Royal Military College of Canada.

Other

See also

 Military history of Canada
 History of the Canadian Army
 Canadian Forces

References

External links

The official RMC website
Joining Instructions - First Year Officer Cadets
A video about the first weeks of a Cadet at RMC
RMC's alumni website

Memorials
Canadian Armed Forces
Military history of Canada
National Historic Sites in Ontario
Royal Military College of Canada
Royal Military College of Canada
Royal Military College of Canada memorials

es:Royal Military College
fr:Collège militaire royal du Canada
nl:Royal Military College of Canada
pl:Royal Military College of Canada